William John Dakin (23 July 1883 – 2 April 1950) was a zoologist who is remembered for the large number of his students who achieved prominence in the area of zoology and for the number of books and papers he wrote on many scientific fields.

Dakin was born in Toxteth, a suburb of Liverpool, England in 1883, as the son of William and Elizabeth Dakin. His father was a coal merchant.

Studying at the University of Liverpool he attained his BSc with first class honours in Zoology in 1905, his MSc in 1907 and his DSc in 1911 on osmotic pressure and the blood of fishes.

In 1912 Dakin applied and was appointed as the chair of Biology at the recently established University of Western Australia. Before arriving to take his post Dakin married Catherine Lewis in 1913.
While at UWA Dakin published The Elements of Animal Biology in 1918, chaired the extension committee, twice visited the Houtman Abrolhos and was the president of the Royal Society of Western Australia.

Dakin was Professor of Zoology at the University of Sydney from 1929 to 1947.

A frequent contributor to early issues of Walkabout, among the books he wrote was Whalemen Adventurers (1934), a history of whaling in Australia. A revised edition was issued in 1938; it was reissued by Sirius Books in 1963.

Legacy
In 1977 a $2000 bequest from his wife was granted to the University of Sydney in his memory. Known as the "William John Dakin Memorial Prize in Zoology", it is awarded annually to a Zoology student attaining first class honours in biology.

References

External links
 

1883 births
1950 deaths
People from Toxteth
20th-century Australian zoologists
Scientists from Liverpool
Royal Society of Western Australia
Australian maritime historians
20th-century Australian historians
Academic staff of the University of Sydney